This is a list of tennis players who have represented the Hungary Fed Cup team in an official Fed Cup match. Hungary have taken part in the competition since 1963.

Players

References

External links
Magyar Tenisz Szövetség

Fed Cup
Lists of Billie Jean King Cup tennis players